Javier Guerra Polo (born 10 November 1983) is a male Spanish long distance runner. He finished 7th in the 2015 London Marathon, and 9th in the 2017 London Marathon.

Competition record

References

External links
 
 
 
 

1983 births
Living people
Spanish male long-distance runners
Spanish male marathon runners
Place of birth missing (living people)
World Athletics Championships athletes for Spain
Competitors at the 2007 Summer Universiade
Competitors at the 2009 Summer Universiade
Athletes (track and field) at the 2018 Mediterranean Games
Mediterranean Games competitors for Spain
Athletes (track and field) at the 2020 Summer Olympics
Olympic athletes of Spain
21st-century Spanish people